Landreth is a surname.

People
 Bill Landreth, American computer hacker
 Chris Landreth, Canadian film maker
 Larry Landreth, Canadian baseball player
 Orian Landreth, American football coach
 S. Floyd Landreth (1885-1977), American senator of Virginia
 Sonny Landreth (born 1951), American musician
 The Bros. Landreth, Canadian musicians

Places
 Landreth Glacier, Antarctica
 David Landreth School, historic school building
 D. Landreth Seed Company, oldest seed company in the United States